Hinduism in Kazakhstan is represented mainly by the ISKCON followers and by expatriate Hindus from India. The Census in Kazhakhstan doesn't recognize Hinduism. According to an estimate, there are about 500 Hare Krishna devotees in Kazakhstan. There were about 801 Hindus in Kazakhstan in 2010 according to ARDA. As of 2020, there were about 1878 Hindus in Kazakhstan.

Recently, the decision of the Kazakh government to raze the Hindu temple created a big controversy.

Community in Kazakhstan

The Indian community in Central Asia consists mainly of students, businessmen, workers, and representatives/employees of Indian or foreign companies. There is a respectable presence of managers, entrepreneurs and traders.

Out of the total diaspora of 2732, 1127 persons are stationed in Kazakhstan. 900 are medical students. About 127 workers/managers are employed by Ispat International, a Soviet era steel plant which was taken over by the NRI businessman Shri L.N. Mittal. The plant, now called Ispat Karmet under Indian management, is a major success story.

Indians also play an important role in other commercial activities and sectors such as pharmaceuticals. Besides Ispat Karmet, the following Indian companies have representatives in Kazakhstan – Ajanta Pharma Ltd, Dr. Reddy's Labs, Ranbaxy, Core, Lupin, IPCA and USV. In addition, a project for setting up a mobile heating unit in Kazakhstan has been commissioned with ITEC funding.

The Indian Cultural Centre in Almaty is active in projecting Indian culture. Several Indian cultural festivals have been held in Kazakhstan.

The committee feels that the Indian community in Central Asia is bound to grow in view of its strategic and economic importance. The recommendations of the committee would also apply, mutatis mutandis, to this region.

ISKCON in Kazakhstan

Kazakhstan recognised Hare Krishna, a form of Hinduism, as an official religious movement in 2002 Worldwide Religious News.

Hare Krishna community now has only two of their 10 currently registered communities – in Astana and in the commercial capital Almaty - more than 50 members.

Thirty Hare Krishna families, most of them Kazakh citizens, lived in about 60 summer huts in Almaty.

Although the Hare Krishna movement was registered at the national and local levels, leaders reported continuing harassment by the local government in the form of repeated lawsuits seeking confiscation of land in Almaty Oblast used as a communal farm. In April 2006 an appeals court upheld a lower court decision that the land should revert to the Karasai regional akimat (equivalent to a county government), because the farmer from whom Hare Krishna followers had purchased the land in 1999 did not hold title, and thus the land had not been properly privatized. On April 25, 2006, local officials went to the commune to evict the followers. Hare Krishna followers peacefully resisted and local authorities did not escalate the situation through force. The Hare Krishnas claimed that the local government targeted the commune because they were a nontraditional religious community. They cited statements by local officials, such as an April 25, 2006, interview with Channel 31 in which a Karasai akimat official stated that the Hare Krishnas were "not accepted as a religion," and that they were dangerous for the country. Independent religious observers, however, believed that the cases are motivated primarily by a financial interest in the land, the value of which has appreciated significantly since 1999. Human rights advocates and international observers brought the issue to the attention of national officials. At the end of the reporting period, the Government had not evicted the residents from the commune and the Hare Krishnas' appeal was pending before the Supreme Court.

Prior to the land confiscation lawsuits, the Hare Krishnas reported tense relations with Karasai akimat authorities, which they believe resulted in the community being subject to frequent inspections. In 2004 the Hare Krishna commune was the subject of eleven inspections by different government agencies including the police, fire protection service, sanitary agency, environment protection agency, and land committee, and subsequently fined for various violations. According to the US State Department, the Hare Krishnas admitted several violations, which they attempted to rectify, but maintained that they had been subjected to closer scrutiny than their neighbors.

See also
Persecution of Hindus

References

External links

Hindu’s Problem in Kazakhstan
Video of demolition
 International Religious Freedom Report 2006 Kazakhstan

Hinduism in Kazakhstan
Hinduism by country
Hinduism in Asia